Magic Fly is the debut studio album by French band Space. It was released in April 1977 by Disques Vogue. The album reached No. 11 on the UK Albums Chart and included the hit single of the same name, which reached No. 2 on the UK Singles Chart and No. 1 in Switzerland and West Germany.

A version of the title track was used as the main theme of the original Chinese version of Jackie Chan's 1978 film Snake in the Eagle's Shadow (蛇形刁手).

Track listing
 "Fasten Seat Belt" – 5:58
 "Ballad For Space Lovers" – 2:16
 "Tango In Space" – 4:28
 "Flying Nightmare" – 3:31
 "Magic Fly" – 4:18
 "Velvet Rape" – 4:27
 "Carry On, Turn Me On" – 8:18
All tracks composed by Ecama

Personnel

Space
Didier Marouani (as Ecama) – keyboards, synthesizers
Roland Romanelli – keyboards, synthesizers
Joe Hammer – drums, percussion
Jannick Top – synthesizers

Production
Jean Phillippe Illiesco – producer
Patrick Fraigneau – engineer, mixing
Jerome Corbier – remastering
André Perriat – remastering

References

1977 debut albums
Space (French band) albums